Rutigliano is a town and commune in the Metropolitan City of Bari, Apulia, southern Italy.

Main sights
Norman castle (11th century), built above a pre-existing Byzantine watchtower or fortification. 
Collegiate church of Santa Maria della Colonna
Church of Sant'Andrea
Church of San Vincenzo
Post Office

References

Cities and towns in Apulia